The 1984 British Open Rally Championship season consisted of six rallies held across the British Isles and was won by the Scot Jimmy McRae. He may have only won the final rally of the season at the Manx Rally to clinch the 1984 title but he got four podium finishes, enough to beat out his rival and triple winner Hannu Mikkola, the defending World Rally Champion from Joensuu, Finland.

Results

Standings

References

External links

British Rally Championship seasons
Rally Championship
British Rally Championship